Heberg is a locality situated in Falkenberg Municipality, Halland County, Sweden, with 450 inhabitants in 2010.

References

Populated places in Falkenberg Municipality